The National Baptist Convention (Conveção Batista Nacional) is a Baptist Christian denomination, affiliated with the Baptist World Alliance and Brazilian Evangelical Christian Alliance. The CBN have many churches and make theological lectures, like "Seminário Teológico Batista Nacional" at São Paulo.

History
It started with a group of 52 Baptist churches in Brazil, who joined together in 1965, that accept the Evangelical charismatic doctrine of gifts of Holy Spirit in their beliefs.

See also
 Bible
 Born again
 Baptist beliefs
 Worship service (evangelicalism)
 Jesus Christ
 Believers' Church

References

External links
Convenção Batista Nacional

More Information
Baptists

Protestantism in Brazil
Baptist denominations in South America
Christian organizations established in 1965
Baptist Christianity in Brazil